The Committee on Legal Affairs (JURI) is a committee of the European Parliament.

Responsibilities
The main responsibilities of the committee are the interpretation and application of international and European law and the compliance of European Union acts with the treaties of the European Union. It is also responsible for legislation in the areas of civil law, commercial law, intellectual property and procedural law. It is responsible for matters relating to the statutes and political immunity of MEPs and EU staff.

The member of the European Commission responsible for legal affairs is the European Commissioner for Justice, Consumers and Gender Equality. In the European Commission. The committee responds to the Justice and Home Affairs Council of the Council of the European Union.

Pre-hearing of designated nominees to the European Commission
The committee scrutinizes the declaration of financial interests of designated nominees to the European Commission and adverts about conflicts of interest. It may declare a nominee unable to carry out his duties of a commissioner if upcoming concerns are not cleared up. In September 2019 the committee rejected two nominees of the Von der Leyen Commission, in particular Rovana Plumb and László Trócsányi.

This scrutiny should not to be confound with the subsequent hearings dealing with the European Commission candidates' portfolio.

Members in the 8th legislature (2014–2019)

Members in the 9th legislature (2019–2024)
Following the United Kingdom's withdrawal from the European Union chair Lucy Nethsingha was replaced by Adrián Vázquez Lázara 
on 17 February 2020.

References

External links
Home page of the JURI Committee

Legal